Brazilian jiu-jitsu (BJJ) does not have an established canon (formalized set of techniques), with significant regional variation seen in both application and naming. Brazilian jiu jitsu initially consisted of judo katame-waza (newaza) techniques, but has since evolved to encompass a far greater variety by absorbing techniques from amateur wrestling, catch wrestling, sambo, and Japanese jujitsu (not to be confused with Brazilian jiu jitsu). Due to its status as an eclectic martial art, much controversy surrounds the renaming of techniques derived from other martial arts. Many of these martial arts including Brazilian jiu jitsu's parent art of judo, was itself a collection of adopted techniques from other older forms of martial arts before developing unique techniques. In recent times however, technical innovations exclusive to Brazilian jiu jitsu (e.g. worm guard, inverted guard) have been developed, setting it apart from its predecessors.

Unlike its direct predecessor judo, which categorises techniques on the basis of mechanism, Brazilian jiu jitsu techniques are frequently eponyms, which leads to confusion among practitioners. Examples include:

 Sode guruma jime ("sleeve wheel constriction", referencing its mechanism) is a judo choke made famous by Ezequiel Paraguassu and as such was renamed the "Ezequiel choke"
 Gyaku Ude Garami ("reverse elbow entanglement", referencing its mechanism) is a Judo armlock that received notoriety for its use by Masahiko Kimura and has hence been renamed the 'Kimura"

Below is a partial list of techniques categorized by type.

Takedowns
Throws
various judo throws or Nage Waza (most commonly)
Tomoe nage
Sumi gaeshi
Osotogari
Ōuchi gari
Tani otoshi
Seoi nage
Guard pulling
Wrestling takedowns
Double leg
Single leg
Ankle picks
Knee tap

Chokeholds

 Strangles
 Rear naked choke
 Triangle choke
 Front
 Side
 Back
 Arm triangle
 Anaconda
 D'arce
 Kata gatame
 North south choke
 Von Flue choke
  Lapel chokes
 Clock choke
 Bow and arrow
 Loop
 Baseball bat
Cross choke
 Chokes
 Guillotine choke
 Peruvian necktie
 Sode guruma jime (Ezequiel choke)
 Rear naked choke (Mata Leão / Hadaka Jime)
 Gogoplata
 Paper cutter
 SuperDave choke

Joint locks 
 Arm locks
 Elbow lock
Armbar
Straight armlock
Arm crush
 Bicep slicer
 Shoulder locks
 Americana (Ude garami)
 Mir Lock
 Kimura (Gyaku ude garami)
 Omoplata
 Wrist locks
 Leg locks
 Straight ankle locks
 Heel hooks
 Toe holds
 Kneebars
 Electric chair (Crotch ripper)
 Spinal locks
 Can opener (Fisherman's crank)
 Twister (wrestler's guillotine)
 Boston crab
 Spine lock

Sweeps 
(not to be confused with foot sweeps which are standing techniques)

 Closed guard
 Hip bump sweep
 Scissor sweep
 Flower sweep
 Lumberjack sweep
 Waiter/Muscle sweep
 Balloon sweep (helicopter armbar)
 100% sweep
 Omoplata sweep
 Half guard
 Old school sweep
 John Wayne sweep
 Pendulum Sweep
 Foot grab sweep
 Open guard
 Butterfly (hook) sweep
 De La Riva sweep
 Heel grab sweep
 Balloon sweep
 Tripod sweep
 Tomahawk sweep

Positional grappling
Guard
Closed guard (full guard)
Half guard
Open guard
Butterfly
Spider
Squid
Lasso
Lapel
De la riva / reverse de la riva
Guard passing
Side Control
Kesa-gatame (scarf hold)
Kuzure kesa gatame
North south
Knee-on-belly
Mount
Back mount
Leg attacks
50-50
Ashi garami (single leg X)
Ushiro ashi garami
Leg Knot/Game Over position
Saddle/Honey Hole/411/Inside Sankaku
Russian cowboy
Russian leg lasso

See also 

Gracie Jiu-Jitsu
List of judo techniques

External links
Jiu Jitsu Rulebook
Explained: BJJ Techniques

jiu